Qalatuiyeh (also Romanized as Qalātū’īyeh; also known as Kalato, Kalātū, and Qalātū) is a village in Gevar Rural District, Sarduiyeh District, Jiroft County, Kerman Province, Iran. At the 2006 census, its population was 193, in 44 families.

References 

Populated places in Jiroft County